9th & Walnut is the eighth studio album by the American punk rock band the Descendents, released on July 23, 2021, through Epitaph Records. The album is made up of songs written by the band between 1977 and 1980, along with a cover of The Dave Clark Five's "Glad All Over". Only three of the originals had been previously released, with the album featuring re-recordings of "Ride the Wild" and "It's a Hectic World" from the band's first 7", as well as "Like the Way I Know", an outtake from the Milo Goes to College sessions that was eventually released on the 1999 compilation The Blasting Room.

Recording info 
The initial sessions took place in 2002 at The Blasting Room in Fort Collins, Colorado, and featured drummer Bill Stevenson with former members guitarist Frank Navetta and bassist Tony Lombardo. The sessions laid dormant until the COVID-19 lockdowns in 2020, when singer Milo Aukerman recorded vocals at his home in Delaware. This marked the first time the "classic" lineup had been featured on a recording since Everything Sucks (1996), and the first album since Enjoy! (1986) not to feature current members Stephen Egerton and Karl Alvarez.

Track listing

Personnel 
Descendents
 Tony Lombardo – bass guitar
 Milo Aukerman – vocals
 Frank Navetta – guitar, vocals on the bridge of "Grudge"
 Bill Stevenson – drums

Charts

References

2021 albums
Descendents albums
Epitaph Records albums
Albums produced by Bill Stevenson (musician)